Presidential elections were held in Mauritania on 21 June 2014, with a second round planned for 5 July if no candidate received more than 50% of the vote. The result was a first round victory for incumbent President Mohamed Ould Abdel Aziz of the Union for the Republic, who received 82% of the vote. Most of the opposition parties boycotted the election.

Background
Mohamed Ould Abdel Aziz was the incumbent President of Mauritania at the time of the election and had been in office since 2009. A career soldier and high-ranking officer, he was a leading figure in the August 2005 coup that deposed President Maaouya Ould Sid'Ahmed Taya, and in August 2008 he led another coup, which toppled President Sidi Ould Cheikh Abdallahi. Following the 2008 coup, Abdel Aziz became President of the High Council of State as part of what was described as a political transition leading to a new election. He resigned from that post in April 2009 in order to stand as a candidate in the July 2009 presidential election, which he won. He stood as a candidate again in the 2014 election.

Conduct
Although boycotted by opposition groups, the African Union praised the elections for taking place relatively peacefully. Turnout was estimated at 56%.

Results

References

Mauritania
2014 in Mauritania
Presidential elections in Mauritania
June 2014 events in Africa